Kenneth Brian Jones (born 9 February 1941) is a former professional footballer who played in The Football League as a midfielder

Career 
Born in Keighley, Jones began his career with Southend United, where he scored 34 times in 87 appearances. He moved to Millwall in 1964, where he made 178 appearances, registering 11 league goals. He moved on to Colchester United in 1969, with a record of 23 goals in 77 league games, before moving into non-league football to play for Margate.

Honours

Club 
Millwall
 Football League Third Division Runner-up (1): 1965–66
 Football League Fourth Division Runner-up (1): 1964–65

References

External links 
 
 

1941 births
Sportspeople from Keighley
Colchester United F.C. players
Southend United F.C. players
Millwall F.C. players
Margate F.C. players
Living people
English Football League players
Association football midfielders
English footballers
Footballers from Yorkshire
Outfield association footballers who played in goal